Monroe Township is one of the fifteen townships of Pickaway County, Ohio, United States.  The 2000 census found 1,166 people in the township.

Geography
Located in the western part of the county, it borders the following townships:
Darby Township - north
Muhlenberg Township - northeast
Jackson Township - east
Deer Creek Township - southeast
Perry Township - south
Madison Township, Fayette County - southwest
Pleasant Township, Madison County - northwest

No municipalities are located in Monroe Township.

Name and history
It is one of twenty-two Monroe Townships statewide.

Government
The township is governed by a three-member board of trustees, who are elected in November of odd-numbered years to a four-year term beginning on the following January 1. Two are elected in the year after the presidential election and one is elected in the year before it. There is also an elected township fiscal officer, who serves a four-year term beginning on April 1 of the year after the election, which is held in November of the year before the presidential election. Vacancies in the fiscal officership or on the board of trustees are filled by the remaining trustees.

References

External links
County website

Townships in Pickaway County, Ohio
Townships in Ohio